The Frank Pierce Carpenter House is a historic house at 1800 Elm Street on the north side of Manchester, New Hampshire. Built in 1891 for the president of the Amoskeag Paper Company, it is a fine local example of high-style Queen Anne architecture. It was listed on the National Register of Historic Places in 1994, and was home to the local chapter of the American Red Cross for approximately 71 years from the start of WWII.

Today it is a privately owned office building protected by the Manchester Historic Association and known as the Carpenter Historic Building, LLC, which recently completed an award-winning historic renovation to the Carriage House onsite to bring back the stable and carriage entrance and former original living space for the caretaker now in use as office space. The building is a local point of interest to visitors of Manchester and part of the Manchester Historic Association's guided tours of Manchester historic homes and people. It is open to public viewing during working hours.

Description and history
The Frank Pierce Carpenter House is located north of downtown Manchester, at the northwest corner of Elm Street (U.S. Route 3) and North Street. The house is roughly square in shape, with a three-story turret at its southeast corner and a projecting window bay at its southwest corner. A -story ell which originally housed service facilities projects to the west. The main (eastern) facade is three bays wide: the turret occupies the left bay, and the main entrance the center. The entry is sheltered by a single-story porch supported by clustered Tuscan columns (replacements c. 1970 for originals styled like those on the building's porte-cochere). The interior is lavishly decorated with period woodwork and imported marble.

The house was built in 1891 for Frank Carpenter, then the president of the Amoskeag Paper Company, and a major city benefactor. It was probably designed by Edgar A. P. Newcomb, who Carpenter had hired to design the city's Carpenter Memorial Library. The multi-acre estate that Carpenter amassed around the house was sold off in portions after his death in 1938, and the house was given a temporary lease of the property during World War II. This lease was made effectively permanent after the war, and the property was formally transferred to the Red Cross in 1993 by Carpenter's heirs, subject to preservation easements.

See also
National Register of Historic Places listings in Hillsborough County, New Hampshire

References

Houses on the National Register of Historic Places in New Hampshire
Queen Anne architecture in New Hampshire
Houses completed in 1891
Houses in Manchester, New Hampshire
National Register of Historic Places in Manchester, New Hampshire